"22 Grand Job" is the debut single by English indie rock band the Rakes, from their debut album, Capture/Release. The song did not chart upon its initial release in 2004, but a re-release the following year proved moderately successful, charting in the UK top 40 at number 39. When headlining Brixton Academy in 2007, the Rakes claimed it was their best song to date.

Track listings
CD 1 (B000BCHJWY)
"22 Grand Job" (1:53)
"iProblem" (3:39)

CD 2 (B000BCHJWE)
"22 Grand Job" (1:53)
"Pass the Metro" (2:39)
"22 Grand Job (Filthy Dukes Society Mix)" (4:25)

References

2004 songs
2004 debut singles
2005 singles
The Rakes songs
V2 Records singles